Modern equipment of the Armenian Armed Forces. This page might contain equipment which are in use with the Artsakh Defence Army, as the equipment is sometimes used by both armies, but will officially contain information pertinent only to the Armenian military.

Personnel equipment

Uniforms

Individual equipment

Small arms

Small arms

Mortars

Man-portable air-defense systems 
Military equipment Armenian Army as of 2008–2021

Anti-tank weapons 

Anti-tank weapons of the Armenian Army as of 2008–2021

Vehicles

Combat vehicles

Military equipment Armenian Army

Transport vehicles

Engineering and recovery vehicles 
Military equipment Armenian Army as of 2008–2017.

Artillery

Multiple rocket launchers 
Military equipment Armenian Army as of 2017/2022.

Other military vehicles

Tactical ballistic missile systems 
Military equipment Armenian Army as of 2008–2020.

Electronic warfare 
Military equipment Armenian Army as of 2008–2017.

Anti-aircraft

Radar systems 
Military equipment Armenian Army as of 2008–2021.

Aircraft

Armenian Air Force aircraft

Unmanned aerial vehicles 
Given Azerbaijan's enormous investments in unmanned aerial vehicles (UAVs), it is perhaps unexpected that Armenia began the 2020 Nagorno-Karabakh War with only a rudimentary unmanned aerial reconnaissance capability and essentially no unmanned offensive capabilities. While the Armenian Ministry of Defence boasted of destroying three Azerbaijani MBTs with domestically manufactured loitering munitions during the July 2020 Armenian-Azerbaijani clashes, the 2020 Nagorno-Karabakh War demonstrated that, despite this zealous claim, no such capabilities truly existed in the Armenian Armed Forces' inventory at the time. This was not due to a lack of locally accessible designs, as Armenian defense firms had produced no fewer than 23 different types of loitering munitions in the last four years! An similar number of reconnaissance UAVs have seen the light of day, with many designs making it to the prototype stage. Rather than investing in these and other promising indigenous systems, the Armenian MoD used the limited funds available to procure four Russian Su-30 attack fighters. The terrible result: a lack of UAVs during the 2020 War, as well as four Su-30s that were unable to be employed due to a lack of funding to purchase their related weapons.

The capabilities of the UAV types that did reach service were essentially primitive. The most prevalent of these, the X-55, a clone of the Russian Ptero-E5, flies on pre-programmed paths based on waypoints via an internal GPS system, capturing images at regular intervals. The imagery is manually extracted after the trip, providing up-to-date intelligence of equal quality to commercial satellite images, but with apparent limitations. More capable varieties, such as the Krunk, were obtained in too little a quantity to make an impact on the 2020 War. During the 2020 War, Russia sent a number of Orlan-10s to compensate for Armenia's severe shortage of reconnaissance capabilities.

Russia is also the supplier of the UL-300 (ZALA 421-16E) and UL-350 (Supercam S350) reconnaissance UAV technology, the latter of which has been verified to have entered service with the Armenian Army. The Gryphon-12 is another Russian UAV that has entered service. The Orlan-10s, which were delivered in late 2020, have also served as the foundation for a new reconnaissance UAV built by Davaro. The delivery of UAVs from Russia, as well as the technological transfer that accompanied them, aided Armenia in rapidly expanding its unmanned reconnaissance capabilities, but effectively ignored Armenian drone producers and indigenous designs.

Armenia's indigenous drone designs are increasingly based on Israeli technology as drone makers strive to emulate their capabilities, thanks to a regular trickle of Israeli UAVs that crash-landed on Armenian soil. In 2020, Davaro, the director of Armenia's UAV manufacturing, acknowledged that Israeli-made UAVs had been handed to his company for research. In turn, a photo of UAVLAB's facility revealed a disassembled Israeli-made SkyStriker, and it doesn't take a genius to figure out that the company's UL-450 design is based on the Orbiter-3. Davaro, in turn, has based its DEV-3 loitering munition (LM) on the Harop, while also emulating Turkey's STM Kargu LM.

After witnessing firsthand the pivotal role of unmanned combat aerial vehicles (UCAVs) during the 2020 Nagorno-Karabakh War, it is only natural that Armenia has endeavored to develop a similar capacity. Despite allegations that Armenia is planning to obtain armed drones from neighboring Iran, the Armenian Ministry of Defense looks to be looking to introduce a homegrown system. Davaro is actively developing the Aralez UCAV, which can be armed with up to four SMA A5 or AGB-003 guided bombs.

Armenia's drone designs are excellent, especially given the Armenian Ministry of Defense's lack of (financial) backing to improve them and eventually enter serial production. Despite claims that widespread manufacture of loitering munitions would begin in the summer of 2020, only two Armenian loitering munition strikes were recorded during the Nagorno-Karabakh conflict in 2020. Nonetheless, it is evident that Armenia is looking into indigenous drone designs in the hopes of deploying them to offset Azerbaijan's growing military advantage. Davaro, Armenia's leading drone creator, signed collaboration agreements in 2022 with Russia's STC (the designer of the Orlan-10), Kronshtadt (the designer of the Orion UCAV), and the UAE's EDGE Group, which might enhance Armenia's rate of innovation in the field of UAVs.

References 

Military of Armenia
Armenian Armed Forces